George Albert "Buck" Flower (October 28, 1937 – June 18, 2004) was an American actor, writer, producer, assistant director, production manager, and casting director. He was sometimes credited as Ernest Wall, Buck Flower, George "Buck" Flower, George Flower, Buck Flowers, C. D. LaFleur, C.D. LaFleure, C.D. Lafleuer, and C.D. Lafleur.

Because of his gruff appearance, he was often cast as a drunk or homeless character. Director John Carpenter gave Flower a cameo role in several films he made throughout the 1980s.

Flower was also the father of actress/costume designer Verkina Flower and Key Grip Marcus "Roo" Flower. He died of cancer at age 66 on June 18, 2004.

Filmography

Film

Television

References

External links

American male film actors
American male television actors
People from Milton-Freewater, Oregon
Male actors from Oregon
1937 births
2004 deaths
Deaths from cancer in California
Eastern Oregon University alumni
Film directors from Oregon
Film producers from Oregon
20th-century American male actors
20th-century American male writers